The Dhepa River is a small river in northern Bangladesh. The river originates from the Atrai River in Mohanpur and falls into the Punarbhaba.

Rivers of Bangladesh
Rivers of Rangpur Division